Westlife is an Irish pop vocal group formed in Dublin, Ireland in 1998. The group currently consists of members Shane Filan, Mark Feehily, Kian Egan, and Nicky Byrne. Brian McFadden was a member, until leaving in 2004. The group disbanded in 2012 after 14 years, later reuniting in 2018. 

In Ireland, the group has 11 number-one albums with a total of 13 top two albums, 16 number-one singles, as well as 34 top-fifty singles. They have sold over 55 million records. and are holders of the following Guinness World Records: first to achieve seven consecutive number-one singles in the UK; most public appearances in 36 hours by a pop group; most singles to debut at number one on the UK chart; and top-selling album group in the United Kingdom in the 21st century. They hold the record for the most shows played at The SSE Arena, Belfast and SSE Arena, Wembley. Westlife has received numerous accolades including one World Music Award, two Brit Awards, four MTV Awards, and four Record of the Year Awards.

The group has released twelve studio albums: four as a five-piece and eight as a four-piece. They rose to fame with their debut international self-titled studio album, Westlife (1999). It was followed by Coast to Coast (2000), World of Our Own (2001), Unbreakable – The Greatest Hits Vol. 1 (2002), and Turnaround (2003), which continued the group's success worldwide. The group released their cover albums Allow Us to Be Frank (2004) and The Love Album (2006) and the studio albums Face to Face (2005) and Back Home (2007).

After a hiatus of studio recording for almost one year in 2008, they released the studio albums Where We Are (2009), and Gravity (2010), and the compilation album Greatest Hits (2011). After eight years, the quartet group released their eleventh studio album, Spectrum, in 2019, followed by their twelfth studio album, Wild Dreams, in 2021.

Their fourteenth, and latest concert tour is called The Wild Dreams Tour.

History

Origin: Byrne, Egan, Feehily, Filan and McFadden's beginnings
Kian Egan, Mark Feehily and Shane Filan, all schoolmates in Summerhill College in Sligo, Ireland, participated in a school production of Grease with fellow Sligo men Derrick Lacey, Graham Keighron, and Michael Garrett. They considered it as the start of Westlife. The sextet formed a pop vocal group called Six as One in 1997, which they later renamed IOYOU. Before this, Egan was part of a punk-rock bands called Skrod, and Pyromania. The group, managed by choreographer Mary McDonagh and two other informal managers, released a single titled "Together Girl Forever" under Sound Records which was written by Feehily and Filan with fellow Irish Those Nervous Animals and The Strong are Lonely band members Padraig Meehan and Daragh Connolly. Another song "Everlasting Love" included in the single was written by Feehily, Keighron, Meehan, and Connolly. There is also an unreleased song called "Good Thing". McDonagh first encountered Egan as a six-year-old student at her weekly dance classes, and came to know Filan and Feehily in their early teens as they starred in shows such as Oliver! and Godspell for Sligo Fun Company.
 
Louis Walsh, the manager of fellow Irish boy band Boyzone, came to know the group after Filan's mother Mae contacted him, but the group failed to secure a BMG record deal with Simon Cowell. Cowell told Walsh: "You are going to have to fire at least three of them. They have great voices, but they are the ugliest band I have ever seen in my life." Lacey, Keighron, and Garrett were told they would not be part of the new group, and auditions were held in Dublin where Nicky Byrne and Brian McFadden were recruited. McFadden was part of an R&B group called Cartel before this.

The new group, formed on 3 July 1998, was originally named Westside, but as another band was already using that name, the group was renamed Westlife. It was revealed that Walsh was already calling them Westlife before the Westside name came along. In Westlife – Our Story, Byrne revealed that, unlike the others in the group, he was keen to change the name to West High. McFadden also changed the spelling of his name to Bryan to facilitate signing autographs. They managed to secure a major record deal the second time around under BMG with all other record labels competed. They signed a four million pound record deal with RCA Records. Westlife's first big break came in 1998 when they opened for Boyzone and Backstreet Boys' concerts in Dublin. Boyzone singer Ronan Keating was brought in to co-manage the group with Walsh. Later, they won a special Smash Hits Roadshow award at that year's Smash Hits Poll Winners Party. Their first live television performance as a group in Ireland and worldwide was on the Irish TV series and the world's second longest-running late-night talk show, The Late Late Show that had its broadcast on 13 November 1998. They performed "Flying Without Wings". The band then released an EP titled Swear It Again afterwards. Both recorded songs under Westside were produced by Steve Mac and written by Mac and Wayne Hector. Cowell chose the debut extended play and single with the guidance of his father, Eric Cowell, who stated then, "I think they will be big".

International breakthrough, Debut album, Coast to Coast, World of Our Own and super stardom (1999–2002)

In April 1999, the group released their first single, "Swear It Again" which immediately topped the charts in Ireland and in the UK for two weeks. It became the biggest-selling single in a week one by a debut artist. On the week of its release and its chart achievement announcement, Cowell's father Eric died. Their second single, "If I Let You Go" was released in August 1999, which established them as the first boy band to hit the No. 1 with its first two singles. They also performed for billions in 1999 at the Miss World telecast with this song. The third single was the highly acclaimed "Flying Without Wings" (their first 'Record of the Year' and their third No. 1 single), released in October the same year, also followed suit. It made them the only the second Irish act and fourth act to debut at No. 1 with their first three singles, B*Witched, Robson and Jerome, and Spice Girls being the other three. "Flying Without Wings" was also included on the soundtrack of the Warner Brothers film, Pokémon: The Movie 2000. Their first album, simply titled Westlife, was released in November 1999 and went to No. 2 in the UK and their first No. 1 in Ireland. The album was the biggest chart dropper on the top 40 in UK music history when, in its 58th week on the charts it leapt from No. 79 to No. 3 before falling to No. 37 the following week. Despite the history, the album successfully managed to peak at No. 1 in Scotland in the year 2001 after premiering at No. 6 at the Scottish Albums Chart in 1999.

In December 1999, a fourth and a double-side single was released, "I Have A Dream"/"Seasons in the Sun". It knocked Cliff Richard's "The Millennium Prayer" off the top spot and earned them the 1999 UK Christmas number-one single. It is also their fourth No. 1 single. It was the first official No. 1 single music act in the 2000s of UK Singles Chart and also the last official No. 1 single music act in the 1990s decade of UK Singles Chart.  They are one of only five acts to achieve four number ones in the UK Singles Chart in one calendar year, the others being Elvis Presley, The Shadows, The Beatles and Spice Girls. The fifth and last single from the album, "Fool Again", also peaked at No. 1. With this, they broke records of being the only male band to have every singles released from an album to reach No. 1 in the UK and the only male group with most original songs in an album that went straight to No. 1 in the UK with multiple and/or with four original singles. Afterwards, Westlife signed to Arista Records for the North American territory after auditioning for the label's founder, Clive Davis. Then the group had a promotional tour in the United States for their "Swear It Again" single and peaked at No. 20 in the Billboard Hot 100. An Asian tour followed in support of their debut album before releasing a second album. On 1 July 2000, they were honored as Freemen of the Borough of Sligo.

Coast to Coast, their second album, was released a year later and was their first No. 1 UK album, beating the Spice Girls' Forever album by a large margin, the said chart battle was widely reported by British media. It became the country's 4th biggest selling album of 2000. This is their second No. 1 album in Ireland. The album was preceded by a duet with Mariah Carey singing "Against All Odds (Take a Look at Me Now)" and the original song "My Love" (their second Record of the Year award). Both singles reached No. 1 on the UK charts, their sixth and seventh number ones respectively. With this, Westlife broke an unexpected record of the most consecutive No. 1 singles in the UK, having their first seven consecutive singles debut at the top by a debuting act and group, and by an act, a group, a male group, a pop act and a pop group in UK and became the fastest number one music act beating Elvis Presley's previous record of three years versus 23 months of Westlife getting each its first No. 1 singles and second music act to have the longest string of number ones in UK history. However, in December 2000, their eighth and an Ireland and UK exclusive single "What Makes a Man", only debuted at No. 2. The single "My Love" was controversially used by Central Intelligence Agency as part of a torture program in Afghanistan. According to the American Civil Liberties Union, "the music pounded constantly as part of a scheme to assault prisoners' senses". They survived the 2000 Mexico City major earthquake and lightning during this time. As the 2000 had ended, Westlife achieved four number one singles in a year for two straight years (1999, 2000) since Elvis Presley (1961, 1962).

Outside the UK and Ireland, they gained chart success with "I Lay My Love on You" and "When You're Looking Like That". This time as well, they were included in the top ten earners list of all acts in UK and Ireland and sold over 2.5 million units in Asia Pacific region. Also in this year, they launched their first world tour, "Where Dreams Come True Tour". A recording of a concert from the tour live from Dublin was released on 19 November 2001. Also in the same month and year, Westlife released their third album World of Our Own, their second No. 1 album in the UK and their third No. 1 album in Ireland.

"Uptown Girl" (their first single to be on the List of million-selling singles in the United Kingdom), "Queen of My Heart" and "World of Our Own" were released as singles, all of which peaked at No. 1 in the UK. Those singles are also their eighth, ninth, and tenth number ones respectively. With their tenth No. 1, they made history by being the shortest music act or band to have ten or double-figures number ones in the UK Singles Chart (2 years and 10 months or 149 weeks) – more than 3 months quicker than The Beatles (165 weeks). "Bop Bop Baby" was also released as a single, but it peaked at No. 5 in the UK. In 2002, Westlife went on their second world tour, the World of Our Own Tour (In The Round). Overall in 2002, IRMA awarded the band plaque about their 1 million units sold in Ireland and ranked seventh as Irish's millionaires under age 30 with 18 million euros for all of the five members. For every performance each band member will get 228,000 euros, which means the 68 dates raked in 1.55 million euros for them by June 2002. The cash rolled in from sales of their merchandise, while a recent advertising deal with Adidas was worth 488,000 euros to each of them with a total of 3.33 million euros each at the end of the said tour.

Unbreakable, Turnaround, and departure of McFadden (2002–2004)

The group sold more than 12 million records in a span of three years during this time. They released their eleventh UK No. 1 single, "Unbreakable" in 2002. Amidst rumours of a split, Westlife released their first greatest hits album in November that same year titled Unbreakable - The Greatest Hits Vol. 1, which zoomed all the way to No. 1 in the UK and Ireland. Their third No. 1 in the UK and the fourth one in Ireland. Also during that time, Westlife bagged another Guinness World Record for most public appearances by a pop group in a 36-hour period. The band made stop-offs in five different cities (Dublin, Belfast, Edinburgh, London and Manchester) to promote their then-new album. The release was followed by the double A-side single "Tonight"/"Miss You Nights", which debuted at No. 3 in the UK and No. 1 in Ireland. At this time, Because Films Inspire made a TV documentary titled "Wild Westlife", directed by Iain MacDonald and starred the group, featuring their daily life as musicians and their tour experiences. It was aired on BBC Choice. In 2003, Westlife went on their third world tour, the Unbreakable Tour and was invited to play at the annual Edinburgh Military Tattoo, shrugging off rumours of a split which is what most of the pop bands do after a Greatest Hits album and tour. A recording of a concert from the tour, live from Manchester, was released in November 2003.

Back in September 2003, Westlife released "Hey Whatever", which peaked at No. 4 in the UK. Their fourth studio album, Turnaround, was then released in November, earning the group another UK No. 1 album, the fourth one. The album is also their fifth No. 1 in Ireland. "Mandy", was released a week before the album release. The band's twelfth No. 1 single. Their version won them their third Record of the Year award, in under five years. Their version of "Mandy" is also considered the single with the longest leap to the top (from No. 200 to No. 1) in UK music history. "Obvious" was released as the final single from the album, charting at No. 3.

On 9 March 2004, just three weeks prior to embarking on their fourth world tour, McFadden left the group to spend more time with his family and six months later to release solo music projects. On that day, a press conference was held where all the group's members were present, each giving emotional individual speeches. McFadden's final public performance as part of Westlife was at Newcastle upon Tyne's Powerhouse nightclub on 27 February 2004. McFadden attended the first day of the band's tour date as an audience. The last time the five had reunited in public was when McFadden acted in an Irish reality television show Anonymous where he disguised as a fan in an album signing event of the group in November 2005 and had a broadcast in January 2006. He subsequently began a solo career, and reverted the spelling of his first name back to its original 'Brian'. McFadden later released more albums and singles, but only with moderate success.

Less than a month after McFadden's departure, the group kicked off their "Turnaround Tour". A live version of "Flying Without Wings" from the said tour was released as an official UK download, earning them the first official UK Downloads No. 1. A recording of a concert from the Turnaround Tour, live from Stockholm, Sweden, was released in November 2003.

Face to Face, Back Home, and cover albums (2004–2008)
In September 2004, they performed on the World Music Awards, where they were recognised as the Best Irish Act of that year. They then released a Rat Pack-inspired album and fifth album ...Allow Us to Be Frank, which peaked at No. 3. No singles from this album were released in the UK but "Ain't That a Kick in the Head?", accompanied with a music video, was released as a digital download in the UK and peaked at No. 4 and as a physical single in other European countries. "Smile" and "Fly Me to the Moon", both with music videos as well, were released as digital downloads only.

Prior to the release of the ...Allow Us to Be Frank album, Westlife scouted for "the perfect fan" to help promote their album. After X Factor-style auditions, they found Joanne Hindley, who recorded "The Way You Look Tonight" with the group. To mark this special collaboration, a special programme was televised, showing auditions and live performances, called She's The One, presented by Kate Thornton. It also featured a live performance by their fathers with their version of "That's Life". Westlife continued to tour Europe as part of their "The Number Ones Tour" which started in early 2005. The tour ranked at number 84 worldwide with top concert tour ticket sales with 191,361. A recording of a concert from the tour, live from Sheffield, was released in November 2005.

By 2004, they sold over 30 million albums already, the biggest live act in UK, and making around £4m each as reported in 2005. In October 2005, Westlife returned with their comeback single, "You Raise Me Up", which was taken from their sixth album Face to Face, their thirteenth No. 1. On 5 November 2005, both the album and the single were at No. 1 in the UK, at the same time, during the second week of the single. It was the first time that Westlife had held both the top album and the top single position in the same week and the first Irish music act to have such feat. This is their fifth No. 1 in the UK and sixth one in Ireland. "You Raise Me Up" was awarded as their fourth Record of the Year in the UK, for 2005. In December of that year, the group released "When You Tell Me That You Love Me", a duet with Diana Ross, as the second single, and it debuted at its peak position of No. 2. This single marked its fourteenth year since the original Diana Ross version was released and peaked at No. 2, the same chart position in the UK Singles Chart in 1991. Westlife then released a third single, "Amazing", which debuted at No. 4. After that, Westlife embarked on the "Face to Face Tour", travelling extensively to the UK, Ireland, Australia and Asia. This tour marked the first time that Westlife travelled to mainland China for a concert. The tour ranked the band sixth for the year with a number of performances with 32 shows and recorded 238,718 paid-for attendances. A recording of a concert from the tour, live from Wembley Arena, was released in November 2006. The band was mentioned as part of the names of male groups that peaked in the United Kingdom album sales in 2005 with 45 percent of the market. By this time, they already sold over 36 million records worldwide.

In late 2006, Westlife signed a brand new five-album deal with Sony BMG Music Entertainment. Their seventh album, The Love Album was a compilation concept album which consisted of popular love-song covers. The album outsold other compilation albums by Oasis, The Beatles, and U2 in its first week of release and went straight to No. 1 in both UK and Ireland. It was the top selling album of 2006 in Ireland and Westlife's seventh and sixth No. 1 album in Ireland and the UK, respectively. Moreover, the only single from The Love Album, "The Rose", became their 14th UK No. 1 single.  This made Westlife the third act (along with Cliff Richard) in the UK to have the most No. 1 singles, tailing behind Elvis Presley (21) and The Beatles (17). In Ireland, they made it to the second place (tied with The Beatles) to have most number one singles, tailing behind U2 (21). They also returned to the Miss World stage where billions saw the exclusive live performance of The Rose. Westlife then kicked off their eighth world tour, "The Love Tour", in Perth, Australia. The group then went on to other Australian cities before moving on to South Africa, the UK and Ireland. The tour had a total of £1,031,033 secondary gross sales.

On 5 November 2007, Westlife released their eighth album, Back Home, which contained nine new original songs along with three cover songs. The album debuted at No. 1 on the UK, their seventh No. 1. It was also 2007's fifth biggest selling album in the UK. This makes them as one of the only five band, with Coldplay, The Prodigy, Stereophonics, and Take That, in UK chart history to claim seven No. 1 albums. With seven of their albums reaching the number one spot from 2000-2007, they attained the fastest accumulation of UK number one albums record in recent history until Taylor Swift's re-recording release of her album Fearless in 2021. The album was their eighth No. 1 in Ireland. The first single released from the album was "Home", which peaked at No. 3 in the UK. "I'm Already There", not released as a single, managed to chart in the UK based on downloads alone, following a performance on an episode of The X Factor UK.

On 15 December 2007, they had a two-hour show called The Westlife Show where they performed 10 of their songs, some of which were voted online by fans and some from Back Home. It was hosted by Holly Willoughby. Months later, "Us Against the World" was announced and released as their second single in UK and Ireland. Before the release of the second single, they embarked on the Back Home Tour on 25 February 2008. This tour marked the first time that the group had travelled and performed in New Zealand, performing four sold-out shows in Auckland, Wellington, New Plymouth and Christchurch. Meanwhile, "Something Right" was released as the second single and "Us Against the World" became the third single in Europe and the Asia Pacific region. Both songs performed well on several music charts.

10th anniversary and hiatus (2008–2009)

From 2005 to 2008, Music Week revealed on their website that Westlife was the official third top touring act within the years while they were the seventh top touring act of 2008. On 28 March 2008, after 27 sell-out shows, in the space of 10 years and have sold 250,000 tickets. All four members were presented with a plaque cast of their hands, which can also be seen in the Wembley Square of Fame similar to Hollywood Walk of Fame. Then to mark their tenth year in music, Westlife staged a special 10 Years of Westlife, a sold-out concert at the world's thirty-third biggest and Europe's fourth biggest stadium, Croke Park, on 1 June 2008. which Egan described to be a "pop extravaganza". It was only the second time for an Irish act to headline the stadium after U2. Filan confirmed that a corresponding live concert DVD would be released. The group announced that they would be on hiatus for a year after their Back Home Tour and that there would not be an album release in 2008 as they would be spending more time on the production of their tenth album. As promised, the group's official website confirmed on 27 September 2008 the release of a DVD on 24 November 2008 entitled 10 Years of Westlife – Live at Croke Park Stadium which went straight to No. 1 on UK, Ireland, South African, Hong Kong and New Zealand Music DVD charts.
As the group ended another successful tour, Walsh announced in the show Xpose that 1 July 2008 would be the official start of the longest hiatus of the group. He said that it will be a one-year break, from that day up to 1 July 2009. On 13 December 2008, while on a break, Westlife made an unexpected appearance during that year's X Factor final where they performed "Flying Without Wings" with runners-up JLS. After the performance, Filan and Byrne were interviewed on The Xtra Factor with Boyzone's Keating and Stephen Gately. As JLS also performed, "I'm Already There", Westlife's version of the song re-entered the UK Singles Chart at No. 63 while a new entry on Ireland Singles Chart at No. 47 due to extensive downloads only. In the last week of January 2009, a DVD entitled The Karaoke Collection was released. This is the first time Sony Music has released an official Karaoke disc for music videos in DVD format. On 27 February 2009 issue of Herald Ireland, Walsh revealed that Cowell had already picked three new songs which he believed would be instant hits. On 18 March 2009, Westlife won the Best Irish Pop Act on the 2009 Meteor Awards for the ninth consecutive time.

Where We Are and Gravity (2009–2010)
Their tenth album, Where We Are, was released on 30 November 2009 in the UK and peaked at No. 2 on both Irish and UK Albums Charts. The lead single, "What About Now", was released a few weeks earlier on 23 October 2009, with digital downloads being available the day before. The said single peaked at No. 2 on both Irish and UK Singles Charts and ranked No. 85 in the year-end official sales chart. Following that month was the announcement of the Guinness Book of World Records for Westlife as the top selling album group of the 21st century with 10.74 million albums sold in the UK alone.

They were also part of the Haiti charity single in early 2010 with "Everybody Hurts", which was organised by Cowell. The said single peaked at No. 1 on both Irish and UK Singles Chart. The tour in support of this album was called, "The Where We Are Tour". The tour entered at number 50 of top concert tour for the third quarter of the year with 241,865 ticket sales. A recording of a concert from the tour, live from London, was released in November 2010. The eleventh album was recorded and processed with songwriter and producer John Shanks in London and Los Angeles and was entirely produced by Shanks. On 14 November 2010, the single "Safe" was released. It debuted on the UK Singles Chart on 21 November at No. 10, giving the group their 25th Top 10 single in the United Kingdom. The new album titled Gravity was released on 22 November 2010. It went to No. 1 in Ireland and No. 3 in the UK. This is their ninth No. 1 in Ireland and this album made Westlife as one of the few musical acts and band and the only pop band to have number one albums in three consecutive decades (1990s, 2000s, 2010s) in their home country. 

As the 2000s decade ends with 275 singles reached the No. 1 position on the chart in the UK. Over this period, Westlife were the most successful musical act and group at reaching the top spot with 11 No. 1 singles only from the said decade, top act with most total number of weeks at No. 1 with individual credits and second to most total number of weeks at No. 1 with 14 weeks. Ten out of their fourteen No. 1 singles were released and came from this decade. Westlife is also the second biggest selling music act in the UK of the 21st century. And second from the list of artist from the past decade, 1990s, in UK Albums and Singles Charts. While in 2005, half of the decade, they were the fifth.

Westlife was named the fourth most hard-working music artist and third most hard-working band in the UK by PRS in 2010. Also from the said year Billboard compiled the top international touring acts worldwide, the group ranked 14th with $5,104,109 estimated net take of tour grosses (assuming a typical 34% artist cut after commissions and expenses). In March 2011, they started their eleventh major concert tour, the Gravity Tour. This tour marked the first time the group travelled to Oman, Namibia, Guangzhou and Vietnam for concerts.

Greatest Hits and split (2011–2018)
As of 2011, the group were the longest reigning band and second longest reigning number one music act in the 21st century in UK. On 14 March 2011, Westlife confirmed that they had left Cowell after 13 years and his record label Syco Music after nine years. The group cited Syco's decision not to release a second single from Gravity as the reason Byrne felt it as another reason of being unloved,

On 23 April 2011, Egan's Twitter account posted a series of tweets saying he was to walk away from the group. He later said his account was hacked and debunked the announcement. After going back to RCA Records full-time for a one-year album contract, they announced their Greatest Hits album to be released on 21 November 2011. It debuted at No. 1 in Ireland and No. 4 in the UK. This is their tenth No. 1 album in Ireland. The first and lead single, "Lighthouse" was released in November 2011. And a follow-up promotional single "Beautiful World" released later. In October 2011, Egan ruled out speculation that McFadden would reunite with them for the new compilation album and its promotion for a television show. Egan said: "All the rumours about Brian re-joining Westlife are untrue. We have been a 4 piece for too long now. We love Brian but it's not going to be. That includes any TV performances." With a new compilation album coming out, it was speculated Westlife would be doing a new greatest hits tour. They were scheduled to headline the ChildLine Concert in Dublin on 12 November 2011 and to have another exclusive concert on O2 Blueroom, also in Dublin on 24 November.

A UK tour was first officially announced on 18 October 2011, with dates confirmed for May 2012 and it was titled, The Greatest Hits Tour or The Farewell Tour. Stereoboard reported that the tour sold out within minutes. On 19 October 2011, Westlife officially announced they were splitting after an album and a tour.

During this time, the Official Charts Company compiled the band's chart history which states that other than their number-ones they had, 25 UK Top 10s, 26 UK Top 40s, 27 UK Top 75s, 20 Weeks at No. 1, 76 Weeks in Top 10, 189 Weeks in Top 40 and 282 Weeks in Top 75 in the UK Singles Chart. While 7 No. 1s, 12 UK Top 10s, Top 40s, Top 75s, 7 Weeks at No. 1, 92 Weeks in Top 10, 189 Weeks in Top 40, and 299 Weeks in Top 75 in the UK Albums Chart. They also had seven number-one albums in eight years, the most number-ones with different albums by a music album act, group, pop group, and male group in the UK Albums Chart in the 2000s and the second most number ones, tied with Rod Stewart, with different albums by a music album act, group, pop group, and male group in the UK clustered per decade since The Beatles in the 1960s and of all time. In Ireland, they have fourteen No. 1 singles and ten No. 1 albums, the most for a pop band and act and male band and act, and Irish band next to U2.

A second statement was issued through their official site, saying the fans were continuing to be the best support system. Some fans on social networks described themselves as feeling "devastated" following news of the split. People left their messages on Twitter by using #WestlifeForever and #Westlife, it trended on Ireland, Indonesia, New Zealand, Philippines, Singapore, Sweden, and the UK. A live stream Q&A happened on 28 October 2011 as a "thank you" to their fans. As part of it, ITV commissioned a one-off music event as they took to the stage to sing some of their greatest hits, it was entitled Westlife: For the Last Time. Another show entitled, The Westlife Show: Live, was broadcast from Studio One of London Studios on the same channel on 1 November 2011. They then had a live guesting on The Late Late Show. They were honored at that time by Scottish Exhibition and Conference Centre (SECC) with four specially commissioned bar stools to mark 49 performances at the venue for over 380,000 fans, selling more tickets than any other act. The band had their final concert on 23 June 2012 at Croke Park Stadium in Ireland. The 82,300 capacity show was sold out in 4 minutes. Due to this popular demand, an extra date was added at Croke Park on 22 June 2012, which also sold out. Combined, there was a total of 187,808 spectators on both nights, exceeding the capacity of the stadium. Their last concert was also screened live in more than 300 cinemas in the United Kingdom, and 200 cinemas worldwide. They also released a DVD, which went to number 1 in both UK and Irish chart. In that year they were also declared the 34th top-grossing tour act of the year with earnings of $35.2 million (€27 million). The farewell tour consisted of eight dates in China and 33 in the UK and Ireland; in total, the band sold 489,694 tickets from the tour.

Cowell and some media predicted a possible reunion in the future, but Westlife put an end to that speculation by vowing they would never reunite. Later reports from the Daily Record said there was an "irreparable rift" in the band, but was later denied by a source close to the band saying: "There's no bad blood in the band, they're still great pals. But all good things come to an end and they are all keen to do their own thing." Later, the band also denied it and called the split a "united decision". However he confessed three months after the split, Byrne said that members of the group fought with one another more and more often in the latter years leading up to the split and he felt that it was the right time to end their time together. A year after Westlife ended, they agreed to all voluntarily wind up Bluenet Ltd, their main entertainment firm, after going their own ways and split €2.3million to €595,500 each except for Filan who missed out any of it as he declared bankruptcy at that time due to property crash problems.

Since the split, the four lads have released albums and singles individually. Filan, with three studio albums and with singles and tours (with support act dates for Lionel Richie) released and a Top 5 hit album in UK. Feehily associated with an independent record label (which he is the co-director) and released albums and singles. He also made it as a supporting act to Mariah Carey and Wet Wet Wet. Egan was voted King of the Jungle on the 2013 series of ITV's I'm a Celebrity series, released one studio album with singles, was a coach judge on The Voice of Ireland, and was a support act for Boyzone. Byrne released one studio album, joined Strictly Come Dancing, hosted several major Irish television and radio shows, and represented Ireland in Eurovision, which was also his debut solo single.

In 2014, Syco Music said to The Sun: "All the guys are up for it in principle. It's now just a matter of sorting out all the details, Syco would love Brian to be part of the band again. It'd create the same sort of buzz as when Robbie Williams returned to Take That. But the other lads will need to be convinced because they were always very clear that when Brian left it was for good." but Egan later tweeted, "Guys I'm sorry to say but I don't know where these rumours are coming from about a Westlife reunion but it's untrue. Sorry #westlifeforever." In 2015, 2016 (On this year, Walsh posted on the band's social accounts that they will not regroup as of the moment), 2017, Walsh expressed that the four-piece band would reunite. He had been in contact with Ed Sheeran and James Arthur to create songs for the band.

However, on 2016–2017, four years following the split, Filan told Lorraine and other media outlets that while there are currently no plans for a Westlife reunion, he would not rule it out for the future. Byrne expressed in 2017, "Shame this Westlife news is not true. They were always my guilty pleasures." He also talked about touring with the group: "Who wouldn't want to do that again? The laugh with the boys and travelling around and seeing all the fans again. It's nearly six years next summer since we've done it so who knows? Maybe in ten years. I've spoken to all the lads individually but we've never brought up a Westlife reunion, the thing about it is the four of us haven't been in a room together since Jodi's [Kian's wife] mum's funeral,' That was the last time we spoke properly as a band, if you want to call it that., I'm sure it will happen but I don't know when and I don't know if even we know when the right time will be." Feehily added, "People have offered us blank cheques to get back together but it's not about money. There are no plans to reform. The time isn't now. We all have a lot more that we want to achieve first. It feels way too soon to be honest, a 20th anniversary tour could still happen one day as 2019 is 20 years since we released our first single, while 2021 is 20 years since our first world tour. So you never know".

On 31 March 2018, it was reported on Allkpop that all of them might guest on a popular Korean musical show Immortal Songs 2 but Filan was the only one who appeared on the show as a judge and a guest performer afterwards. Egan answered that this and other reports were untrue and the rest of the group members sided with Egan's response after as well. Later they revealed they had been phoned up by Walsh and Cowell every six months since their split. On 23 September 2018, several Irish news outlets started reporting that the group has been signed to Universal Music Group for a new five-year album and tour deal with Virgin EMI Records.

Reunion, Spectrum album, and tour (2018–2021)
On 3 October 2018, the group formally announced that there'll be new music and a tour coming soon on their official social media accounts like on their newly created Instagram. Their reunion story caused huge fan reaction worldwide. According to the reports, they had been preparing for their comeback for the past year of 2017 as Feehily had said on the same year that he hoped to get them all together for a proper catch-up. It was later revealed that Egan and Filan first talked about their reunion when Adele released "Hello" in late 2015. While Byrne raised his concerns about "...where Westlife's music fits into the current market" and not wanting to be simply a "nostalgia" act. He went on to say, "While we were away, we realised what Westlife really meant to the fans – and to us." McFadden was not involved in the reformation as he said on an interview with Closer Magazine, "...there's no reason for me and the boys to stay buddies." and "For me, it was just a job. I only met the guys when I joined the band and have no regrets about leaving." Their first live interviews and press conferences as a four-piece in six years were made 20 days later held in Dublin and Belfast where they revealed their plans to stick around longer. Days later, it was followed by several radio interviews in Manchester, Ulster, Dublin and Glasgow. Walsh also said in separate interviews that the most important things now are the songs, it will be featured as an introduction to their new sound and added, "I was just waiting for them to decide when. There were record deals on the table, but the icing on the cake was Ed Sheeran writing these amazing songs for them, as well as having Steve Mac, who produced their early songs, on track too." [...] "Sheeran's input adds a contemporary edge", "I've heard the first two songs and they are just incredible." Mac and Sheeran have come up with four new tracks for them. One will be a single co-written by Sheeran. Some had been composed since 2016. The duo have co-written recent hits like the most streamed song on Spotify, "Shape of You", and also "Woman Like Me" by Little Mix, and "Thursday" by Jess Glynne. Mac revealed the band's signature sound will be back. Feehily and Filan added, "We're not trying to change Westlife's sound, we're trying to evolve", "We need to be a Westlife 2.0, a better version of ourselves. We wanted to come back and recreate Westlife's sound, but better, and be a better band, and the most important thing about any band is music." In November 2018, Byrne expressed 2019 will be "one hell of a year" On 19 December 2018, Egan and Feehily posted a picture of the group's first rehearsals together in six years and Egan added that "2019 will be nothing but epic". A musical and a documentary film about them and their reunion were also reported.

"Hello My Love", their first single since 2011 was released on 10 January 2019. It reached No. 1 in iTunes Store Top Songs in more than fifteen countries that include the United Kingdom and Ireland, reached top 10 in 23 countries, and charted in more than 50 countries only minutes after its release. It was released in four official versions: Original, instrumental, acoustic, and a remix. Their first UK, worldwide television and recorded professional appearance, performance in seven years and of the single was on The Graham Norton Show on 11 January 2019 where it was tagged as "one of the most highly-anticipated TV comebacks of the decade". They also performed the single on the 24th National Television Awards on 22 January 2019 and it was their first live television performance, first The O2 Arena and arena performance together in seven years. Their first Irish performance and television appearance together was in the finals night of Dancing With the Stars Ireland on 24 March 2019. Their first tour and first promotional tour in general and for a single release together outside UK and Ireland in seven years was on Singapore on 29 January 2019 to 1 February 2019. It reached number-two in Ireland and Scotland. It was their highest charting on their official singles charts since the band's "What About Now" single in 2009, ten years ago. The single got its Silver certification four months after its release and its Gold certification seven months after its premiere in the UK. In Ireland, it has a 2× Platinum certification.

The full-length album is released on 15 November 2019. It is in different formats like the CD, digital download, vinyl, and a limited box set edition. Some of the album formats are bundled with their official tour merchandise. It is their eleventh studio album, their first major album to be released in eight years and first studio album in nine years. In November 2018, the pre-order links for the upcoming album were released on Amazon Australia, Japan, UK, and HMV. The album is titled Spectrum. The album peaked at number one in Ireland, Scotland, and the UK and was certified as Gold in the UK and as Platinum in Ireland. This is their first number one album in twelve years in the UK and in eight years in Ireland. This is also the fastest selling album in 2019 in Ireland. This is their eighth UK number-one album making them the fifth band (fourth until Coldplay got their eight number-one album week after) to have eight UK number-one albums with the likes of Led Zeppelin, and R.E.M. Overall, they are one of the only ten bands that has had eight number-one albums. It marks their eleventh number-one album in Ireland.

To promote the album before its release, more singles were released like the second one, also by Mac and Sheeran with Fred Again (George Ezra, Prettymuch, Rita Ora), which was called "Better Man". It was their second number one on the UK Singles Physical Chart and reached number two on the UK Singles Sales Chart and Scottish Singles Chart in 2019. It was also released in orchestral and acoustic versions. The third single, "Dynamite", was released on 5 July 2019 and was released in three different mixes. The single was their 27th Top 10 hit in Scotland and 29th Top 40 hit in Ireland. The fourth single from the album, "My Blood", was released on 25 October 2019. "My Blood" ended up peaking at number ninety-six on the UK Singles Chart and at number-six on the Scottish Singles Chart. It also peaked at number forty-six in the Irish Singles Chart.

Since their comeback in 2018, their previous singles "What About Now", "Queen of My Heart", "If I Let You Go", and "My Love" reached the higher Gold certifications in the United Kingdom after ten, seventeen, eighteen, and twenty years of their releases respectively. "Flying Without Wings", and "World of Our Own" were certified Platinum twenty years after its release. While "When You're Looking Like That" after twenty years and "The Rose" after thirteen years achieved their Silver certifications since their releases respectively in the same country. Six were certified in 2019, one in 2018, and two in 2020.

On the evening of 17 October 2018, the UK and Ireland dates of their latest tour were announced through Westlife's social networks and was called The Twenty Tour. A pre-order site of the forthcoming new Westlife album, for both unsigned and limited signed (which was taken down minutes later), from their official store was cited where fans will receive an exclusive pre-sale code for early access tickets to the 2019 tour. Pre-sale tickets were all sold out before the general sale and the event had been described as a "big one" making the original tour dates sold out at the very time of its general sales opening. The tour had twelve original dates and fourteen more dates added on places like Liverpool, Leeds, and Sheffield in less than seven hours due to high demand. In their first full print interview as a band in six years, they said: "We will get to everyone eventually." Egan added, "Every country that wants to see Westlife will see us at some point. We won't step away from this until we've managed to tour the world." Seventeen additional Asian dates were announced from 21 March 2019 onwards; the tour has a total of fifty-one dates and took place at some of Asia's and Europe's largest indoor arenas and stadium. It was their fastest selling tour to date.

The second day of the tour in Croke Park had a live film broadcast in selected cinemas in at least fourteen European countries on 6 July 2019, and in more than 600 cinemas live via satellite in UK and Ireland alone. A delayed broadcast in at least nine Asian countries that include Hong Kong, India, UAE, Bahrain, Qatar, and in Australia and New Zealand were done from August 2019 as well. They hired the Cirque du Soleil team for the production, stage design, and routines of the tour. A follow-up cinema screenings of the filmed tour date was produced from August 2019 onwards as well in a sing-along version that kick-started in Denmark, Ireland, and UK. This was released in a video album in different formats on 13 March 2020. It reached the number one in UK and Ireland and stayed at the top spot for more than thirty weeks on their official charts.

On 13 September 2019, they announced that they are scheduled to play at Wembley Stadium in London, England and at Páirc Uí Chaoimh in Cork, Ireland, both for the first time, as part of their Stadiums in the Summer Tour, which was later renamed. The tour play dates were moved from 2020, 2021 to 2022 due to the COVID-19 pandemic with most of the original scheduled tour dates were also cancelled.

On 8 February 2021, the band revealed the mutual parting of ways with Virgin EMI Records and details of a new and groundbreaking partnership are imminent.

Wild Dreams (2021–present)

On 17 March 2021, they formally announced through different medias that they signed a new album deal through Warner Music UK and East West Records.

After 514 days since their last get together, they played eight of their songs live together for a BBC Radio 2 event on Ulster Hall, Belfast on 25 August 2021 and was broadcast from 10 September 2021. An estimate of sixty-eight thousand people have applied to be part of the audience that night but an approximate number of only 160 people has been picked because of COVID-19 restrictions.

"Starlight", the lead single from their twelfth studio album, was released on 14 October 2021. The album, Wild Dreams, was released on 19 November 2021 but was pushed back to 26 November 2021 on 13 October 2021. It is in different formats like the CD, digital download, streaming. Some of the album formats are bundled with their official tour merchandise. 

On 29 October 2021, a new schedule for their renamed fourteenth concert tour, The Wild Dreams Tour, was released. It included fourteen new dates and venues, with eight more dates added later. They also announced that their Wembley Stadium date would be streamed live in various cinemas in Europe.

On 17 December 2021, a Westlife concert filmed at London’s Bush Hall Venue and broadcast by Tencent’s WeChat (Weixin) across China's most popular social media platform had an audience of almost 28 million. It received 160 million likes during the 100 minute stream. It was the first ever livestream concert by the band, and by an international artist in China. This was followed by being the special guest on Backstreet Boys livestream concert on the same said platform on 24 June 2022. The two band's collaboration of Westlife's song "My Love" had trended to number-one on the country's top social media Weibo. As of 7 April 2022, according to Official Charts Company, they are currently the fifth biggest-selling albums artist of the 21st century alone in the UK with 12,907,183.

Popularity
Westlife's debut album and single coincided with the apogee of boy band popularity, and their success was most apparent in Ireland, the UK, and most of African, Asian, Australian and European continental countries. They had album certifications in Brazil, Mexico, Philippines and the United States as well. They had 13 worldwide concert tours and sold over 5.5 million tickets. In April 2001, over one million fans wanted to chat with the lads from 122 countries. Voted worldwide as the best boy band on MTV Battle of the Boybands with thirty-two bands in the choices in 2012. Their battle between Backstreet Boys garnered the highest rate of votes with more than one million in a specific voting time only. The total votes throughout the two-week competition got more than 12 million votes. The final battle was between them and the Jonas Brothers. They have more than 50,000 official fans club members in mainland China alone in 2006. Also in China's largest music streaming site, QQ Music, they are the most followed western boy band, third western band, fourth male band, and twenty-fifth overall international music act as of August 2019. Boy band One Direction was mistaken for Westlife in Ghana. They are the biggest selling international, foreign album act in Indonesian and Philippine music records history. They are the only international artist who is able to sell an album with more than one million units in Indonesia and their Westlife and Coast to Coast albums are in the top ten best selling albums of all-time in the Philippines. They are Vietnam's most viewed music artist in YouTube as of 2015. Their version of "You Raise Me Up" is on the top 75 best selling singles of all time in Australia. Voted by the public four times as The Record of the Year and twice as Best Pop Act on Brit Awards in the UK where they also have the most awards and nominations on the said category's history. In 2000s, "Swear It Again" became a popular song for wedding and funerals in the British Isles. In 2009, "Flying Without Wings" was listed as seventh most popular song for wedding's first dances in UK. In 2012, their version of "You Raise Me Up" and also "Flying Without Wings" made it to the top 20 most popular songs used at funerals. In 2016, three of their songs ("I'll See You Again", "Flying Without Wings", "You Raise Me Up") made it on the top pop music choices for funerals in Ireland. In 2019, "You Raise Me Up" appeared as the eighth top pop music choices in funerals in the United Kingdom and second in Northern Ireland. In South Korea, their albums Coast to Coast and World of Our Own are the top two best selling albums from a western boy band of all time and nine out of twenty albums listed in the top best-selling albums of western boy bands of all time are from the band. Also in South Korea, their singles "My Love" and "You Raise Me Up" stayed in the top 75 of the Official International Karaoke Charts since the inception of the charts in December 2010 up to its recent chart released. The only Irish act, pop band, boy band to have two of previous Marvel Hollywood Actors had been cast in two of the lads' music videos. Vinnie Jones who played as Juggernaut in X-Men: The Last Stand was featured as the Duke Vincent in "Bop Bop Baby", while Ioan Gruffudd who played as Mr. Fantastic in Fantastic Four 2005 and 2007 was featured as one of the high class customers in "Uptown Girl". The only Irish act, pop band, boy band to have worked with three American Idol judges (Mariah Carey, Simon Cowell, Lionel Richie). Demo song "Beautiful in White" reached more than 278 million views (on a single video only) on YouTube as of September 2021, making it as the most successful original song from a pop act that was not released as an official single and never made any albums (until Filan released a different version for his solo album, accompanied with an official music video). Another non-single Westlife song that became popular online is "I Wanna Grow Old With You", co-written by the band members, has an estimated total combined plays of more than 300 million as of January 2021. Their song "My Love" is the most viewed, liked, and shared Facebook video post from a boy band and their medley video is also the second most liked one.

They were invited by Wayne Rooney and Coleen Rooney to sing on their wedding reception in Portofino, Abbey of Cervara, Italy and got paid £400,000, one of the highest amount paid acts, highest for a pop band, boy band and Irish act and band for a wedding in world history. They are Coleen's favorite pop band, also invited to her 21st birthday but was unable to make it. Egan said later that it was more of Rooney who is a big fan of the band as revealed to them by Coleen. The band also performed for the Sultan of Brunei, an occasion on which they were paid £2.5 million to play a private concert of seven songs. They also performed at the Nobel Peace Prize Concert in 2000 with "I Lay My Love on You" and "My Love", in 2005 with the songs "World of Our Own" and "You Raise Me Up" with Rolf Løvland and Fionnuala Sherry, and in 2009 with "What About Now" and "You Raise Me Up" in front of former US President Barack Obama and met him afterwards. They also played for Queen Elizabeth II twice and for Pope John Paul II once in a live concert television show and shook hands with them after. They were the first ever pop band to top the entertainment bill at the Vatican City and a private concert for the Pope. They also personally met former UK Prime Minister Tony Blair and picked autographs also for his daughter. The band was also mentioned in the book version of Me Before You, which was released in 2012. Westlife's songs were also used as film soundtracks six times that include "Safe" for Dolphin Tale in 2011, "You Raise Me Up" for Mrs. Brown's Boys D'Movie in 2014 and "Flying Without Wings" for Pokemon: The Movie 2000. Their songs were also used as soundtracks for television shows such as Britain's Got Talent, Coronation Street, Dancing on Ice, Emmerdale, EastEnders, Hollyoaks, So You Think You Can Dance UK, and The X Factor UK (they are the most performed professional and international live music act in X Factor as well). Westlife's name was used by the main character Vicky Pollard in the popular UK comedy television series Little Britain with one of her famous lines, "swapping her baby for a Westlife CD". They were referenced as part of 1990s pop culture on the British band Busted's 2018 music video "Nineties". Their songs appeared in more than a thousand compilation albums.

Despite their success worldwide, Westlife was unable to break into the U.S. market. They had only one hit single in the United States, "Swear It Again", which peaked at No. 20 on the Billboard Hot 100 in 2000. The band made an appearance on MTV's Total Request Live and the U.S. edition of their debut album, Westlife was released, but it didn't meet with success. In 2002, with the two most prominent boy bands in the US, the Backstreet Boys and *NSYNC, going on hiatus that year, an attempt was made to promote and release a US version of "World of Our Own", but was never successful. Billboard called the failure due to corporate politics.

"Flying Without Wings" peaked at number-two in the US when American Idol: Season 2 winner Ruben Studdard recorded and released it as his debut single. In 2003, Westlife went to Nashville to film a TV documentary. While they were there, they gave a live performance of the song "Daytime Friends", originally by country music singer Kenny Rogers. Though Westlife didn't gain as much success in the States as they did elsewhere, their music was still appreciated. Kid David Corey, assistant PD and music director at top 40 WXKS (Kiss 108) radio station in Boston, Massachusetts was a Westlife supporter that was recorded saying "Bands like Backstreet Boys and 'N Sync are still climbing the charts, and radio is supporting them, so I don't think the boy band thing is going to hurt them. Besides, this song ["Swear it Again"] is just too good for any of that to be a concern. I can't imagine anyone not playing this because it's another boy band, especially when it doesn't even sound like those other guys."

Some have also criticized the band for doing many covers, having the same sound on every album released, lack of use of musical instruments and lack of songwriting skills. Feehily revealed in 2009: "There were many songs which I would be even scared to mention, you know, that were suggested to us which we turned down. There were many cover versions and many original songs that were either terrible. There was loads of stuff through the years, like 'You Are Not Alone' by Michael Jackson?, that were suggested by their record company chief Cowell".

Collaboration
Before their success, the band served as supporting opening acts for the boy bands Backstreet Boys and Boyzone. Since then, the group has recorded studio and live performances with music acts including Mariah Carey ("Against All Odds (Take a Look at Me Now)"), Lulu ("Back at One"), Joanne Hindley ("The Way You Look Tonight"), Diana Ross ("When You Tell Me That You Love Me"), Donna Summer ("No More Tears (Enough Is Enough)"), and Delta Goodrem ("All Out of Love"), "If I Had Words" with The Vard Sisters, "I Have A Dream" with Indonesian child-star Sherina. These songs were also recorded and included on various albums. In 2002, Westlife re-recorded their hit song "Flying Without Wings" with Mexican singer Cristian Castro and with Korean singer BoA as two separate duets.

Westlife has performed live duets with many other music artists including: Will Smith, Wyclef Jean, Toby Keith, Esperanza Spalding, Luis Fonsi, Alexander Rybak, Amadou and Mariam, Willow Smith, Jaden Smith, Jada Pinkett Smith, Lang Lang, Wang Leehom ("You Raise Me Up"), Mary Black ("Walking in the Air"), Sinéad O'Connor ("Silent Night"), Dean Verbeeck ("Swear It Again"), Donny Osmond ("Crazy Horses"), Kevin Spacey ("Beyond the Sea" and "Fly Me to the Moon"), Mariah Carey ("Never Too Far/Hero Medley"), Secret Garden ("You Raise Me Up"), Lionel Richie ("Easy"), Boyzone ("No Matter What"), Ronan Keating ("The Dance"), Ray Quinn ("That's Life"), JLS ("Flying Without Wings"), Dolores O'Riordan of The Cranberries ("Little Drummer Boy") and recorded with various artists for a charity single and performed for a live concert or television performances specials with music artists such as Steps, Lisa Scott-Lee, 5ive, S Club 7, The Cheeky Girls, Tony Hadley, Blazin' Squad, Gareth Gates, Liberty X, Girls Aloud, Busted, McFly, Jonathan Wilkes, Suranne Jones, Darius, Emma Bunton, Leona Lewis, Rod Stewart, Cheryl, Mika, Michael Bublé, Joe McElderry, Miley Cyrus, James Blunt, Blue, Gary Barlow, Mark Owen, Jon Bon Jovi, James Morrison, Alexandra Burke, Jason Orange, Susan Boyle, Rachel Stevens, JLS, Jamie Cullum, Gloria Estefan, Kylie Minogue, Robbie Williams, and V, where the former boyfriend of Feehily was a member named Kevin McDaid.

Artistry and influences
Westlife have always been known as a vocal - harmony group and not a typical boyband as they are not known for dancing or any other typical boyband attributes. They are mainly a pop group, mostly famous for their power ballads and mastered harmonies. They cited Michael Jackson, Backstreet Boys and Boyzone as their musical influences.

Products and endorsements
Some of the products that Westlife officially released, aside from their music releases, include video games, Cadbury chocolates, books, calendars, and tour merchandise such as T-shirts, jewellery, stationery, toiletries, dolls, watches, clocks, mugs, duvets, wallpaper, key chains, and posters. Their second studio album Coast to Coast received additional products, mostly in Asia, that included MRT transport ticket, picture card calendar, postcard set, signed fold-out poster, glossy slipcase and Filofax. They also received sponsorship from Tayto in 2000 and for their concert tours from Calvin Klein in 2001, Adidas in 2002 and Volkswagen in 2011. They have official and unofficial books released, including the book written by the members of Westlife, which was released on 16 June 2008 by HarperCollins UK Publishing entitled, 'Westlife - Our Story', as part of their 10th year celebration. The band released two perfume gift sets, "X" and "With Love".

Charitable support
The group has supported various charitable causes. They were involved in the "Helping For Haiti" charity single that was released in February 2010, as well as releasing a cover version of "Uptown Girl" for Comic Relief, one of their biggest selling singles to date.

They have participated in a Royal British Legion poppy appeal, Irish Blood for Life 2004 and did an advertisement for Galway's Irish Water Safety campaign. They also lent their support to the Irish Blood Transfusion Service (IBTS). On 4 November 2005, they performed with other music artists at Coca-Cola Dome in Johannesburg, South Africa for The "Unite of the Stars" Gala Banquet charity concert that supports four charities: the Nelson Mandela Children's Fund, Unite Against Hunger, St. Mary's Hospital and the Topsy Foundation. They also performed live for charity on Sport Relief, Macmillan Cancer Support, Croí, Western Alzheimer's, O'Dwyer Cheshire Home, Mayo Cancer Support Group, Marie Keating Foundation, Outward Bound Trust, ChildLine, Children in Need, Sheffield's Children Hospital. They had also helped for auctions on Meningitis Research Foundation, Carlton Celebrity Auction for Centrepoint (for the homeless), the National Society for the Prevention of Cruelty to Children, and The Samaritans), Zutto charity painting, Pushing The Envelope (for National Literacy Trust). They've been involved also with the following organizations: Royal National Institute for the Deaf (RNID), Cancer Research UK, United Nations' World Food Programme (WFP), Muscle Help Foundation, Global Breast Cancer Awareness Campaign and Real Man campaign. They are also included as ambassadors of The Irish Society for the Prevention of Cruelty to Children (ISPCC). As part of IPSCC, Feehily signed up for their anti-bullying campaign, "Join the Fight for Children's Rights". and Aware, Byrne for Heart attack and Asthma awareness campaigns, Daily Star's Reclaim Our Streets crusade, Byrne for Oxfam's East Africa famine appeal (by Celtic F.C. v Manchester United F.C. football match), and for Children's Hospice South West (by Truro charity football match). Filan, Byrne for Soccer Aid, J.P. McManus Invitational Pro-Am, One World Beat. Filan for Irish Red Cross (by Sligo Rovers F.C. Showgrounds football match), and Egan for Strandhill Indonesian Relief Fund (SIRF, in aid of the South Asian tsunami victims).

Members
 Shane Filan – main vocalist (Melody/1st Tenor) (1998–2012, 2018–present)
 Mark Feehily – lead vocalist (1st Tenor) (1998–2012), main vocalist (2018–present)
 Nicky Byrne – sub vocalist (2nd Tenor/Baritone) (1998–2012), (2018–present)
 Kian Egan – sub vocalist (Bass), occasional live instruments (1998–2012), (2018–present)
 Brian McFadden – lead vocalist (Baritone) (1998–2004)

Timeline

Discography

 Westlife (1999)
 Coast to Coast (2000)
 World of Our Own (2001)
 Turnaround (2003)
 Allow Us to Be Frank (2004)
 Face to Face (2005)
 The Love Album (2006)
 Back Home (2007)
 Where We Are (2009)
 Gravity (2010)
 Spectrum (2019)
 Wild Dreams (2021)

Awards and nominations

Tours

Concert tours
Headlining
 East Meets Westlife Tour (2000)
 Where Dreams Come True Tour (2001)
 World of Our Own Tour (2002)
 Unbreakable Tour (2003)
 Turnaround Tour (2004)
 Number Ones Tour (2005)
 Face to Face Tour (2006)
 The Love Tour (2007)
 Back Home Tour (2008)
 Where We Are Tour (2010)
 Gravity Tour (2011)
 The Greatest Hits Tour (2012)
 The Twenty Tour (2019)
 Wild Dreams Tour (2022-2023)

Supporting
 Backstreet Boys – Backstreet's Back Tour (1997)
 Boyzone – Where We Belong Tour (1998)

Promotional tours
 1998–2012; 2018–present UK and Ireland Tour
 1999 European, East Asian and Southeast Asian Tour
 2000 European, North American, South American and Asian Tour
 2001, 2002 European, Korean, Mexican and United States Tour
 2003 European, Hong Kong, Japan, and Malaysian Tour
 2005, 2006 European, Taiwan Tour
 2007 Australian Tour
 2009 Swedish Tour
 2019 Singapore, Indonesian, Chinese, Swedish Tour

See also
 List of best-selling boy bands
 UK Singles Chart records and statistics
 List of artists who reached number one on the UK Singles Chart
 List of best-selling music artists in the United Kingdom in singles sales
 List of artists by number of UK Singles Chart number ones
 List of UK Singles Chart number ones of the 2000s
 List of UK Singles Downloads Chart number ones of the 2000s
 List of UK Albums Chart number ones of the 2000s
 List of artists who reached number one in Ireland
 List of songs that reached number one on the Irish Singles Chart
 List of best-selling albums in the Philippines

References

External links

 
 

 
Brit Award winners
Irish boy bands
Irish pop music groups
1998 establishments in Ireland
Musical groups established in 1998
Musical groups disestablished in 2012
Musical groups reestablished in 2018
2012 disestablishments in Ireland
2018 establishments in Ireland
Musical groups from Dublin (city)
Ballad music groups
Teen pop groups
RCA Records artists
Sony BMG artists
Syco Music artists
Universal Music Group artists
Vocal quartets
Vocal quintets
World Music Awards winners
EMI Records artists
MTV Europe Music Award winners